Stylisma is a genus of flowering plants in the morning glory family, commonly known as dawnflowers. This genus is native to the eastern United States.

This genus consists of low vining or trailing herbs. They are found primarily in the Southeastern Coastal Plain in sandy habitats. However one species, Stylisma pickeringii, extends into the Midwest.

Species
The following species are recognised in the genus Stylisma:

 Stylisma abdita Myint
 Stylisma aquatica (Walter) Raf.
 Stylisma humistrata (Walter) Chapm.
 Stylisma patens (Desr.) Myint
 Stylisma pickeringii (Torr. ex M.A.Curtis) A.Gray
 Stylisma villosa (Nash) House

References

Convolvulaceae
Convolvulaceae genera
Taxa named by Constantine Samuel Rafinesque